The men's 400 metres hurdles event at the 2013 Asian Athletics Championships was held at the Shree Shiv Chhatrapati Sports Complex. The final took place on 7 July.

Medalists

Results

Heats
First 2 in each heat (Q) and 2 best performers (q) advanced to the semifinals.

Final

References
Results

400 Hurdles Men's
400 metres hurdles at the Asian Athletics Championships